Bombus pyrenaeus is a species of bumblebee. It is native to Europe, where it occurs in Andorra, Austria, Bulgaria, France, Germany, Greece, Italy, Montenegro, North Macedonia, Poland, Romania, Serbia, Slovakia, Slovenia, Spain, Switzerland, and Ukraine. Its German-language common name is Pyrenäenhummel. It is a common species, becoming abundant in some areas.

Description
It has a wide yellow-gray transverse band on the collar, a grayish-yellow transverse band on the scutellum and a third gray yellow transverse fascia between the 1st and 2nd tergites.

There are several different subspecies separated among mountain ranges:
B. p. afasciatus – Tatra Mountains
B. p. balcanicus – Carpathians and Balkans
B. p. pyrenaeus – Pyrenees
B. p. tenuifasciatus – Alps

Biology
This is a species of alpine climates in high mountain ranges. It feeds on many kinds of plants, but it favors Crocus vernus, thistles, and bilberries.

References

Bumblebees
Hymenoptera of Europe
Insects described in 1879